Krysa is a surname. Notable people with the surname include:

Leandro Krysa (born 1992), Argentinian chess player
Oleh Krysa (born 1942), Ukrainian American violinist